Actibacter is a genus in the phylum Bacteroidota (Bacteria). The genus contains a single species, namely A. sediminis.

A. sediminis
A. sediminis, like other members of the phylum Bacteroidota, is Gram-negative and its major respiratory quinone is MK-6. Additionally, it grows aerobically and forms yellow-pigmented colonies which, however, do not contain Flexirubin-type pigments. This non-motile rod-shaped bacterium was isolated from tidal flat sediment of Dongmak on Ganghwa Island, South Korea.

Etymology
The name Actibacter derives from:Latin noun acta, seaside; New Latin masculine gender noun, a rodbacter, nominally meaning "a rod", but in effect meaning a bacterium, rod; New Latin masculine gender noun Actibacter, rod from the seaside.

While the epithet sediminis is from Latin genitive case noun sediminis, of a sediment.

See also
 Bacterial taxonomy
 Microbiology

References 

Bacteria genera
Flavobacteria
Monotypic bacteria genera